Mexrrissey is a Mexican band co-founded by Camilo Lara (Mexican Institute of Sound) and Sergio Mendoza (Calexico, Orquesta Mendoza). Inspired by Morrissey and The Smiths' songs, Camilo and Sergio along with: Ceci Bastida, Jay de la Cueva, Alejandro Flores, Chetes and Ricardo Nájera began this musical project in 2015. Their album No Manchester (2016) contains Morrissey songs translated into Spanish with a mix of Latin beats and sounds added to the music. After their first show in Mexico City, the band began with a UK tour in April 2015. During the spring of 2018, Mexrrissey conducted a UK tour promoted as "La Reina Is Dead".

Members
 Camilo Lara (Mexican Institute of Sound) – DJ, Production, Vocals, Sampling
 Ceci Bástida (Tijuana No!) – Vocals, Keyboard
 Sergio Mendoza (Calexico & La Orkesta Mendoza) – Vocals, Accordion
 Chetes (Zurdok) – Vocals, Guitar
 Jay De La Cueva (Molotov, Moderatto, Fobia, Titán) – Bass
 Alejandro Flores (Violinist for Café Tacvba) – Violin 
 Ricardo Nájera (Furland) – Drums
 Adan Jodorowsky (Adanowsky) – Guitar
 Líber Téran (Los De Abajo) – Guitar 
 Jacob Valenzuela (Calexico) – Trumpet
 Alex Gonzalez (Twin Tones) – Trumpet 
 Clemente Castillo (Jumbo) – Vocals, Guitar

Albums
No Manchester – released March 4, 2016. 
 El Primero del Gang (First of the Gang to Die)
 Estuvo Bien (Suedehead) (Live at Radiolovefest)
 Cada Dia Es Domingo (Everyday Is Like Sunday) (Live at Radiolovefest)
 México (Mexico) (Live at Radiolovefest)
 Cada Día Es Domingo (Everyday Is Like Sunday)
 International Playgirl (The Last of the Famous International Playboys)
 México (Mexico)
 Estuvo Bien (Suedehead)
 Entré Más Me Ignoras, Más Cerca Estaré (The More You Ignore Me, the Closer I Get)
 Me Choca Cuando Mis Amigos Triunfan (We Hate It When Our Friends Become Successful)
 El Primero Del Gang (First of the Gang To Die) (Live at Radiolovefest)
 International Playgirl (The Last of the Famous International Playboys) (Live at Radiolovefest)

References

External links

Musical groups established in 2015
2015 establishments in Mexico
Musical groups from Mexico City
Mexican rock music groups
The Smiths